Walter Thomas may refer to:
Walter Thomas (baseball) (1911–1983), American Negro league baseball player
Walter Thomas (musician) (1907–1981), saxophonist and arranger in Cab Calloway's orchestra
Walter Aubrey Thomas (1864–1934), British architect
Walter Brandon Thomas (1848–1914), British playwright
Walter Babington Thomas (1919–2017), New Zealand-born British general
Walter W. Thomas (1849–1912), English architect
Walter Horstmann Thomas, American architect
Walter Thomas (priest), Church of Ireland priest

See also
Thomas Walter (disambiguation)